John F. Benton (1931 Philadelphia – February 25, 1988 Pasadena) was the Doris and Henry Dreyfuss Professor of History, at the California Institute of Technology.

He graduated from Haverford College, with a BA in 1953, from Princeton University with an MA in 1955, and PhD in 1959. 
He taught at Reed College and the University of Pennsylvania.

Awards
 1985 MacArthur Fellows Program

Works
Self and society in medieval France: 1064? - c. 1125, Guibert of Nogent, Ed. John F. Benton: Translator C. C. Swinton Bland, Harper & Row, 1970

References

External links
"John F Benton", Google Scholar

1931 births
1988 deaths
Haverford College alumni
Princeton University alumni
Reed College faculty
University of Pennsylvania faculty
California Institute of Technology faculty
MacArthur Fellows
20th-century American historians
American male non-fiction writers
Fellows of the Medieval Academy of America
20th-century American male writers